Police IT is the flagship project of the Karnataka State Police aimed at digitizing all the processes involved in policing from basic functions like crime, law and order, maintenance, and traffic to ancillary functions like police motor transport and training; and connecting all the locations of the state police viz. police stations, circle office, sub-divisional police offices, district police offices, campus networks at COP, CID, chief office and other offices of special units. It has been brought under CCTNS now.

The software comprises 12 modules over which MIS is overlaid to support different workflows and their interdependence in regular policing. It has identified 64 end users who have different roles in the day to day policing work and user interfaces catering to their individual needs have been created. The software could generate 417 different reports which help in supervision, the ultimate aim being to support the executive in policy-making, saving much time in surveying and paper work. 
	
Currently the software is in the verge of integration with seven other legacy systems in different departments of the Karnataka government so that the whole of policing could go digital in the days to come.

Background

Several initiatives have been introduced in the past to leverage IT in police functioning. Some of these include central government initiated programs such as the NCRB-led CCIS (crime and criminals information system) and CIPA (common integrated police application), and state-led initiatives such as e-COPS in Andhra Pradesh, Thana Tracking System in West Bengal, CAARUS in Tamil Nadu and HD IITS in Gujarat.

In 2008 CCTNS (Crime and Criminal Tracking Network and Systems) was conceived as a mission mode project fully sponsored by the government of India under the National e-Governance Plan to provide a comprehensive integrated application platform and a nationwide networked environment for sharing real time crime and criminal information across more than 15000 Police stations, nearly 6,000 higher offices of the country.

Since all these systems were standalone in nature covering only processes regarding crime in general, a strong need was felt to create a comprehensive system supporting all the police requirements in the state and the Karnataka state police has come up with Police IT as its ERP for policing.

Objectives

The reports generated and the workflows included are designed considering the following objectives

Help executive in planning by easy access to information and real time statistics generation
Optimal staffing
Effective direction and control by higher offices
Improved coordination between various offices
Customized reporting by generation of a wide range of reports
Reduction in paperwork and manual register maintenance

Technology

The Police IT software is built on .NET 2.0 framework on Windows 2008 enterprise server. Database interface has been built using ADO.NET. Data storage is UNICODE based resulting in comprehensive support of Kannada, the official language of the state. Reports have been developed using Crystal Reports and transmission is in Adobe PDF documents. Database layer is developed using MS SQL 2005.

MPLS is used to connect the major LANs at district police offices, commissioner of police, crime investigation department, and the chief's office through a 2-4 Mbps MPLSnetwork to the state police data Ccnter at Madiwala. VPNoBB connects all other locations inclusive of all police stations with a 512- 2048kbit/s bandwidth to the State Police Data Center. A central aggregation bandwidth of 155 Mbps, fiber optic MPLS connects the data center to the whole state.

Work flow modules

The Police IT software application has been divided into 12 modules with different workflows with the facility of exporting data across modules along with the possibility of generating reports with information across different modules. The core functions of policing are incorporated in crime, law & order, and traffic modules. The three modules named finance, administration, and stores provide the administrative support required for the department. Armed, motor transport, and training modules provide ancillary support; wireless and the FSL are technical modules. The functionalities of these modules are achieved from inception until conclusion in each case by providing users at different levels in hierarchy with different rights to update and supervise by role based access. The whole application in its journey towards a paperless office helps the police which is a documentation intensive department do away with hundreds of records the maintenance of which is both manpower intensive and time-consuming.

Crime
This module facilitates the collection of detailed information about the history of the crime and criminals and assists in investigation process. It allows for capturing of crime data from the time of registration of first information report and monitors the case even after conviction.  In addition it allows generation of a comprehensive account of the crime.

Workflow of crime module
The workflow for crime process starts with registration of first information report which can be done by a station house officer, and then the case can be investigated by him on his own or assigned/transferred to another investigating officer. In property offences, details of property have to be entered and classification of crime is required for report generation at later point of time under different heads. The investigating officer then starts a case diary detailing the progress of the case. The investigating officer, on completion of the investigation files the charge sheet or final report in the court of jurisdiction. Court progress of these cases are noted until disposal and on disposal, if the accused is convicted, conviction memo is prepared and then the case may go for appeal.

The application captures all the details in each of these processes under different components of the crime module such as FIR, case assignment, crime classification, case diary, crime details, property seizure, property movement, arrest and court surrender memo, bail bond, remand application, witness details, charge sheet, court progress diary, court disposal, conviction memo, result of appeal, modus operandi bureau, BCR(a), BCR(b) history sheet, case transfer, and forensic science (laboratory request). Similar workflow based components are designed in all the modules to cater to the respective services.

Law and order
This module collates data relating to activities involved in facilitating maintenance of law and order in the state. It is subdivided into Law and order activities, intelligence and foreigners' registration modules. Law and order activities are mainly carried out at police station level while intelligence and foreigners' registration module will be used at district and commissioner's districts.

Traffic
This module covers various activities of law and order issue related to traffic. This captures and collates data relating to accidents, enforcement of the Indian Motor Vehicles Act 1988, and fine collection. The module generates 53 reports related to the traffic incidents, accidents and violations based on various criteria like age of vehicle and driver and accident prone areas which help in perspective planning for better traffic management and avoiding accidents.

This module in future is expected to be integrated with BTRAC, the Bangalore traffic police technology-driven traffic-management system and Black Berry systems for a totally digitized traffic control system across the state.

Finance
This module covers information pertaining to the budget and expenditure of the department which includes financial transactions like payables to various vendors, loans to police personnel.

Administration
This module helps in managing the activities related to police administration in an orderly manner and gives brief or comprehensive reports as required. The module supports personnel administration related activities. Business processes covered under this module cover the entire period of engagement of the police personnel with the department starting from recruitment until retirement through maintenance of service records, transfers, leave, punishments, promotions, retirement and into pension initiation.

Stores
The stores module takes care of stocks, purchases, indent, issues of all items used in a police department such as general items, motor vehicles, wireless instruments, FSL instruments, arms and ammunition, vehicle spare parts, fuel, oil and lubricants, and properties like land, buildings, and quarters. The details pertaining to kit articles are also maintained.

Armed reserve
The state police reserve includes state reserve police, city armed reserves, and district armed reserves. They supplement the regular police in the maintenance of law and order. The module captures details of deployment of platoons and personnel at various places for performing law and order duties from the state, district and city reserve. This module, apart from helping in administration and maintenance related activities of reserve police personnel, assists the higher authorities in getting the details of availability of platoons in various reserve police units at any point of time which acts as an important input in planning deployment of available platoons. Armory is generally located in the district armed reserve and also the state reserve police has its own armory in many cases. Armory is a sub-module in the armed reserve module of police IT which captures the details of the issue and return of all weapons and ammunition to the men and maintains the details stock of all weapons and ammunition at various levels and places and also captures the details of firing practice.

Motor transport
This module maintains the history of the vehicles of the police department throughout the lifetime from procuring and maintenance until disposal or condemnation. The comprehensive coverage includes maintenance of history sheets, capturing of day-to-day activities of vehicles, drivers, fuel consumption, petrol bunk transactions and regular inspections. This module eliminates the maintenance more than 15 kinds of forms and other records and also eliminates the time in formal communication for vehicle repairs, maintenance and overhauls.

Training
Various state and national level academies, institutes and units provide training to officers of all ranks, and other police and clerical personnel. The courses offered vary from induction courses to refresher and theme courses. This module covers all the activities relating to handling of these courses at various institutes and units along with library management activities like book keeping and issuing. Details related to on the job training provided to personnel at all levels is captured in this module.

Wireless
This module captures operations of the police wireless and control room and includes information relating to both equipment maintenance and operations. The operations include maintenance of wireless log, transmission of approved messages, message logs, etc. and equipment maintenance includes maintenance of registers related to purchase, usage and repairs.

Forensic science lab
Forensic science lab is the testing laboratory of the police department with its laboratories at national and state levels which conducts various tests on the requests coming from the police department and other government departments. This module captures the administrative functionality of the forensic science lab unit as a whole. This involves capturing and maintaining the information of the cases registered in the module on request from police station or otherwise, flow of the case through the different sections in forensic science lab, status of the case at each point of time until its final disbursement back to the requested unit. It also captures the various other day-to-day activities of forensic science lab like scene of crime requisition, court duty attendance and ammunition and equipment usage.

Management information system
The nanagement knformation system module is the dashboard of Police IT. This dashboard gives all the details in a tabular and graphical format pertaining to all modules of Police IT.

KGSC services
Apart from functionalities in these modules, the software also caters to capturing of the details of petitions and other requests that come under the purview of the police department as identified by the Karnataka Guarantee of Services to Citizens’ Act 2011 which specifies timelines and standards for the services to be provided to citizens by the government agencies including law enforcement departments.

KSPWAN

The Karnataka State Police wide area network was created exclusively for facilitating real time exchange of information among smaller computer networks prevalent at DPOs, campus networks at COP, CID, chief's office, police stations, circles, SDPOs, and other offices of special units by integrating them into one network.  This network presently caters to the information exchange within the department but intends to create a wider network bringing all other departments related with policing as a part of the same network.

Currently the network includes
906 police stations
234 circle offices
129 sub-divisional police offices
30 district police offices
6 range offices
6 regional forensic laboratories
12 Karnataka state reserve police battalions
1 railways police u
1 police headquarters
1 state crime record sureau
Special units

Legacy systems

These are digitized modules which are already functional in certain wings in police department and in various departments of the Karnataka government catering to different requirements of administration.

E-Beat

It is the new system of beat service adopted by Karnataka Police with an aim to introduce technology for ensuring accountability and efficiency. The system uses radio frequency based technology to perform beat service, wherein in place of the Point books in the Beat area, a radio-frequency identification tag is installed; the RFID tag contains a microchip with a unique identifier stored on it. This unique identifier can only be read using aa RFID rReader which operates at a similar frequency. The information regarding the beat constables performing the beat, the beat no to which it should be used for beat service, the beat point locations to be visited is fed into it before assigning it to the beat constable and deployed. The beat constables carry the reader to the beat, read the unique ids from the beat point location, complete the beat and return the reader to the station house officer with a detailed report along with it. The SHO will download the contents from the reader which is basically the date and time of visit to a beat point along with name and designation of the person who visited the beat points.  The system ensures physical presence of the police personnel on beat which itself is a deterrent for unlawful activities. Also the system keeps track of manpower utilization and assists the SHO in devising strategies for crime prevention and monitoring of human resources. The e-beat application provides various reports which assist the SHO in keeping track of the offences and correlate with the beat performance and crime occurrence.

GCARE
GIS-based crime analysis and reporting engine is developed for State Crime Records Bureau (SCRB), Karnataka State Police by the Karnataka State Remote Sensing Applications Centre (KSRSAC). With this application, the information stored in the crime criminal information system database can be viewed against spatial background over a map.

The main functionalities in G-CARE are crime mapping, crime analysis, village analysis, and hotspot analysis. The data capture involves creation of point data by capturing each and every first information report number on the correct location of the map. In crime analysis, the CCIS data queried according to user defined criteria are displayed on the map with help of graphical symbols. In village analysis the information about a location and its sensitivity will be displayed on the map with graphics. Hotspot Analysis involves identifying spots of repeated occurrence of a particular crime over a district boundary.

G-CARE allows viewing of all the police station boundaries, their subsequent circles and subdivisions up to the district level. A module has also been developed to monitor and display the areas spatially, affected by illegal mining/quarrying along with the villages affected by the rampant usage of illicit liquor. The system retrieves information which helps to  analyze the situation which in turn will help easy and fast decision making in SCRB.

Black Berry

This is an initiative of the Bangalore traffic police which brings together all aspects of operational traffic policing in one unified system. The Bangalore traffic police Officers are provided with a Black Berry Smart phone and a Bluetooth printer and they can access the history of any driver and vehicle and issue challans on the spot to offenders. The system is capable of pulling out data from more than two million cases in less than two minutes. Vigilance is also observed through video cameras set up at different traffic signals and the traffic staff at the control room continuously update the database of offenders’ vehicles monitoring the footage recorded. 
Online booking of violations using Black Berry and video monitoring also ensures tracking of habitual offenders and unpaid violation notices issued in the past. The system has resulted in better traffic management and increased revenue and has been replicated by the Hyderabad Traffic Police in Andhra Pradesh.

Dial 100

It is the Public Distress Response system which uses GSM, Wireless Media, and Computer based Command and control from Police control room, multiple vehicle mount terminals and GIS based navigation and guidance. On receipt of complaint / grievance from public by Dial 100 to Control Room, an incident report is generated and is transferred to the dispatcher electronically in real time.
 
The wireless operator/dispatcher assesses the incident report along with all details of complaint, address, telephone number and scene of crime and GIS map (Digital Map) of the city / locality to help dispatcher to see the address on the map for the incident. GPS based Vehicle tracking system displays the real time availability of the PCR(Police Control Room) vehicles which will respond to the emergency call. The dispatcher based on above information will instantaneously transfer the incident report to the identified Patrol van on to its Mobile Data Terminal (MDT) for attending to the emergency and the system enables the dispatcher to monitor the patrol van in real time on his computer. After successfully attending the emergency calls the system /dispatcher closes the event. The calls handled by the Police control room are fully monitored and stored in computer systems to facilitate the response process to be computerized.

Automated Finger Print Identification System (AFIS)

 
It is a software used to capture and search Finger Prints of suspects, arrested and convicted persons. The software facilitates search of ten digit fingerprints of arrested and suspected persons and chance prints developed at crime scene by FP Experts. It uses Minutiae based search after converting the fingerprints available on ten-digit F.P. slips and lifted chance prints to their digital form. Since it is a Minutiae based search even the most partial chance prints not having delta or core i.e., complete pattern, are successfully searched on the entire database of AFIS and the search results are offered with great speed and fool-proof accuracy. 
The Karnataka State Police installed an imported portable live scan device in various police stations in the State under the Police Modernization scheme for obtaining ten-digit fingerprints of arrested and convicted persons at police station level and to get the search results on-line from the jurisdiction finger print units/central AFIS server within the least possible time limit. 
At present each District FP Unit is connected to the DPO via network and also the central AFIS server installed in State FPB, to facilitate fast & accurate search of ten prints and chance prints on-line and communication of search results within few minutes.

e-Procurement

This is the digital platform created by the department of e-governance for facilitating the process of procurement of supplies/ work/ services to all government departments. The e-procurement value chain consists of suppliers/vendors registration, indent management, E-tendering, e-auctioning, catalogue management, and contract management.

More than 400 suppliers/vendors have enrolled through the website after fulfilling qualifying criteria to participate in the e-tendering. The departments and their sub-units opting for e-procurement have to register themselves with the centre for e-governance. When a tender is published on the e-procurement portal, it gets notified to all the vendors along with different dates, cut off dates in the process. The department can receive bids in the electronic form which will be saved in an encrypted format. A total of 24 government departments including the Karnataka state police are utilizing this service

HRMS

This is the web-based application merging basic HR activities and processes with Information technology. Currently it is rolled out in the entire state and is generating salary bills of more than five lakh employees of all categories and pay scales like State, Centre, UGC, AICTE, Judicial etc. and is also maintaining employee service history. The HRMS system takes care of the two main functions Service Record Maintenance and Payroll Generation of employees.

The Payroll module automates the pay process by gathering data on employee time and attendance, calculating various deductions and taxes, and generating periodic pay cheques and employee tax reports. The pay bill is then submitted to Treasury for payment. The SR(Service Record) or maintenance function covers all other HR aspects from recording the details of new employee joining service to his retirement. The system records basic demographic and address data, training and development, capabilities and skills management records and other related activities.

Khajane

The Online Treasury Project of the Karnataka State Government is a Government-to-government (G2G) project which computerizes all the 216 Treasury offices in Karnataka and is connected to a central server at the State Secretariat. A citizen interface is provided for service pensions and Social security pensions which is an exception to its G2G nature. The entire treasury activity can be tracked through this system from the time of approval of the state Budget to the point of rendering accounts to the government. The applications being supported by the system presently are payments, receipts, deposits, pensions, stamps, social security pensions and report generation etc.

GPS based Automatic Vehicle Location System (AVLS)

GPS based Automatic Vehicle Location System (AVLS) is an electronic device installed in a vehicle to enable the owner or a third party to track the vehicle's location and also receive additional information about vehicle. Karnataka state police has taken a decision to equip all their deployment vehicles, especially those of the Karnataka State Reserve Police(KSRP) and district armed reserve with AVLS. This enables police officials to find out the deployment location of any vehicle in real time. By this senior officials can supervise deployment effectively as well as can deploy the nearest police vehicle in case of law and order situations or any other emergencies and this would ensure faster police presence whenever required.

Deployment Team
The application is deployed by the SCRB Police IT team. The team monitors the training, deployment, implementation and hand holding tasks related to Police IT. A team is also constituted in every unit under the overall leadership of the Unit Officer which consists of the officers and officials of various levels to deploy the application in their concerned units. The table shows the deployment status of each of the modules and some of the important  sub components.

Challenges

The project was started from scratch and faced different challenges at different stages. Due to the lack of skilled manpower and the nature of works being multifaceted in nature the requirement validation had proved a difficult task and identification of processes and workflows was another big task. Then the bureaucratic resistance to change and the need for giving technical training to semi-skilled manpower had been biggest problems in implementation. The project currently being under phased deployment, duplication of works is another problem. The coordination with other departments which are comparatively less digitized is another major problem currently being faced by the department.

Rewards and recognitions
Mr. Suresh P, Police Inspector and Mr.Raja Imam Kasim, Police Inspector of SCRB were honored with the Karnataka Chief Minister's Medal for Meritorious Service for remarkable contribution in the field of Capacity Building  for Police IT
 
Central e-Mission Team of CCTNS project has recognized the utility of the software and has requested for sharing of the source code.

Way forward

Integration of Police IT Project with Legacy Systems and CCTNS has been approved by the state government and is in progress under the Challenge Fund Scheme established to support innovative ideas in technology by the state government. Provision of digital signature to officers at different levels and persuading other departments like judiciary and revenue departments to go online to accept the reports of the police online forms next priority after integration with CCTNS. The state government has expressed its willingness to provide technical support to the center and other states in their efforts at digitizing their respective policing processes and departments.

References
 Karnataka State Police
 Karnataka Police academy
 Bangalore City Traffic police
 Cyber Police, Bangalore
 Bangalore Commissioner office
 CCTNS Crime and Criminal Tracking Network System
 ECops, AP Police
 E-Beat Karnataka Police
 AP State Police
 National e-governance plan
 HRMS System
 State remote sensing application centre

E-government in India
Science and technology in Karnataka
Karnataka Police